Fahrudin Aličković (born 19 July 1976) is a Serbian retired footballer who played as a defender.

Career
Playing as a defender, he played in FR Yugoslavia, Singapore, Slovakia and Romania.

References

External links
 

1979 births
Living people
Bosniaks of Serbia
Serbian footballers
Sportspeople from Novi Pazar
Association football defenders
FK Novi Pazar players
Tampines Rovers FC players
FC VSS Košice players
ŠK Futura Humenné players
CFR Cluj players
FK Košice-Barca players
MŠK Turany players
Second League of Serbia and Montenegro players
Singapore Premier League players
2. Liga (Slovakia) players
Liga I players
Serbian expatriate footballers
Expatriate footballers in Singapore
Serbia and Montenegro expatriate sportspeople in Singapore
Expatriate footballers in Slovakia
Serbian expatriate sportspeople in Slovakia
Expatriate footballers in Romania
Serbia and Montenegro expatriate sportspeople in Romania
Serbia and Montenegro expatriate sportspeople in Slovakia
Serbia and Montenegro expatriate footballers
Serbia and Montenegro footballers